The Sri Lanka Railways Class M2 is a class of diesel-electric locomotive that was developed in 1954 by General Motors Diesel, Canada, and Electro-Motive Division, USA. This is considered one of the most successful locomotives in Sri Lanka.

It is a General Motors Diesel (Canada) EMD G12 model using the EMD 567C,  engine.

Description

Introduction
From 1954, several batches of General Motors-manufactured locomotives were imported to Sri Lanka under "The Colombo Plan". Locally called a "Canadian" engine – there are actually two classes of Canadian engines in SLR – the other one is Class M4. Since these engine were imported under grants from the Canadian government, class M2 locomotives are named with Canadian province and city names. The last two locomotives were made in the United States and imported for Cement Corporation, Sri Lanka. But they were later attached to Sri Lanka Railways locomotive fleet. They were named after two local cities – Galle and Kankasanthurei – where the cement factories were located.

Entering into Service
The class entered service in January 1955.  "Ruhunu Kumari" Train started using M2 572 " British Columbia" 24 October 1955, the first long distance luxury passenger train service in Sri Lanka. same loco hauled the first "Udarata Manike" Colombo Badulla train on 23 April 1956 and same day started "Yal davi" hauled by M2 569 "ontario", in the far north of the country.

Sub Classes

In Service
This have been used on both passenger and freight trains on Sri Lanka's railways for over 50 years. Despite the introduction of more modern types of traction, as of 2013 a significant number are still in use.

Locomotive Fleet

Accidents & Incidents
 Number 569, 570, 571 landed in Sri Lanka on 2nd and 3rd December 1954.
 Number 569 went on the first trial on 10th December 1954.
 Number 571 went on the first trial on 15th December 1954.
 Number 570 went on the first trial on 30th December 1954.
 Number 572 went on the maiden journey with Ruhunu Kumari on 24th October 1955.
 Number 572 went on the maiden journey with Udarata Manike on 24th April 1956.
 Number 570 was trapped in Kankasanthurei from 1992 to 1996 due to the civil war after hauling the last night mail train to Kankasanthurei. Brought to Colombo by ship as parts, re-assembled and went back on track.
 Number 571 Saskatchewan was completely destroyed on 14th September 1985 near Pollipothana due to a bomb blast by terrorists.
 Number 570 Alberta faced minor damages when a land mine exploded in Punani on 7th June 2007 and severely damaged as a result of Pothuhera train accident on 30th April 2014
 Number 591 Manitoba was damaged on 26 December 2004 when pulling the Matara Express and was hit by the Indian Ocean tsunami. and added back to service after four months. This was repainted depicting a sea wave on its livery.
 Number 628 Kankasanthurai was badly damaged by a land mine, but was rebuilt

Gallery

References

M02
Electro-Motive Division locomotives
General Motors Diesel locomotives
A1A-A1A locomotives
Bo-Bo locomotives
Railway locomotives introduced in 1954
5 ft 6 in gauge locomotives